Elmo N. Natali (born January 27, 1927) is a former American football player and coach. He served as the head football coach at California University of Pennsylvania from 1973 to 1976, compiling a record of 6–28. Natali was selected by the Cleveland Browns in the 1953 NFL Draft. The Elmo Natali Student Center at Cal University bears his name.

Head coaching record

References

1927 births
Living people
American football running backs
California Vulcans football coaches
California Vulcans football players
Virginia Tech Hokies football players
People from Allegheny County, Pennsylvania
Players of American football from Pennsylvania